"The One to Sing the Blues" is a song by the British rock band Motörhead, which Epic Records released in a number of formats; 7-inch and 12-inch singles, cassette-single, CD-single as well as a shaped picture disc. It reached number 45 in the UK Singles Chart. It is the opening track on the 1916 album. It was the band's first CD single.

Although its official release date is 5 January 1991, Lemmy stated it "came out a few weeks earlier – on my birthday, as a matter of fact", which is 24 December 1990 continuing to say "that's a really great song – maybe we'll put it back in the set one of these days".

Critical reception
In review of 5 January 1991 Paul Elliott of Sounds found the main riff of this song "somewhere between Thin Lizzy's 'Sha La La' and 'Massacre', with some killer lead from Würzel." In the end Elliott summarized: "Still the ugliest, still the loudest."

Single track listing 
All songs were written by Lemmy, Würzel, Phil Campbell, and Phil Taylor.

7-inch single 
 "The One to Sing the Blues" – 3:07
 "Dead Man's Hand" – 3:29

12-inch and CD singles 
 "The One to Sing the Blues" – 3:07
 "Dead Man's Hand" – 3:29
 "Eagle Rock" – 3:07
 "Shut You Down" – 2:38

Personnel 
 Lemmybass guitar, lead vocals
 Würzelguitar
 Phil "Wizzö" Campbellguitar
 Phil "Philthy Animal" Taylor drums

References 

Motörhead songs
1990 singles
1991 singles
Songs written by Phil Taylor (musician)
Songs written by Lemmy
Songs written by Würzel
Songs written by Phil Campbell (musician)
1990 songs
Epic Records singles